Paris Kea (born April 7, 1996) is an American professional basketball player for the New York Liberty of the Women's National Basketball Association (WNBA). She previously played for the Indiana Fever and New York Liberty. She was selected 25th in the 2019 WNBA draft by the Indiana Fever. She played college basketball at North Carolina.

College career

Vanderbilt (2014–2015)
Kea began her college career at Vanderbilt. As a Freshman she appeared in 31 games with 8 starts. After the season ended Kea announced that she would transfer to North Carolina.

North Carolina (2015–2019)
Sat out due to NCAA transfer regulations.

In her first season with North Carolina, Kea led the team in points and assists.

Kea averaged 19.4 points per game which was good for third in the ACC. Kea also earned First Team All-ACC Honors.

First Team All ACC and WBCA All-America Honorable Mention. As the lone senior on the team Kea lead North Carolina to its first NCAA tournament appearance in her college career, they were defeated in the first round by California.

Professional career
The Indiana Fever selected Paris Kea with the 25th pick in the 2019 WNBA Draft. After one season with the Fever playing mainly in a reserve role she was released on April 22, 2020.

On August 7, 2020, Kea signed with the New York Liberty.

WNBA career statistics

Regular season 

|-
| style="text-align:left;"| 2019
| style="text-align:left;"| Indiana
| 11 ||  0 || 5.5 || .407 || .556 || .500 || 0.5 || 0.5 || 0.1 || 0.2 || 2.6
|-
| style="text-align:left;"| 2020
| style="text-align:left;"| New York
| 11 || 5 || 15.0 || .384 || .394 || .875 || 2.0 || 1.5 || 0.6 || 0.3 || 6.9
|- class="sortbottom"
| style="text-align:center;" colspan="2"| Career
| 22 ||  5 || 10.2 || .390 || .429 || .750 || 1.2 || 1.0 || 0.4 || 0.2 || 4.8

Source:

References

1996 births
Living people
American women's basketball players
Basketball players from Greensboro, North Carolina
Indiana Fever draft picks
Indiana Fever players
New York Liberty players
North Carolina Tar Heels women's basketball players
Point guards
Vanderbilt Commodores women's basketball players